Juan Carlos Bazalar Cruzado (born 23 February 1968) is a Peruvian football manager and former player who played as a defensive midfielder.

Club career
Bazalar developed as part of the youth system of Universitario de Deportes, and played his first professional game by Universitario to continue his development as a player.

International career
Despite his age he was still periodically called up for Peru. He represented Peru in the 2007 Copa America. Bazalar has made 26 appearances for the Peru national football team.

Personal life
He is also the father of footballer Alonso Bazalar. He had expressed a wish to play alongside his son who was part of the U-17 team that went to the U-17 World Cup in 2007.

Honours

Club 
Universitario de Deportes
Peruvian First Division (4): 1987, 1990, 1992, 1993

Alianza Lima
 Torneo Apertura: 1997
 Torneo Clausura: 1997
Peruvian First Division: 1997

Cienciano
 Copa Sudamericana: 2003
 Recopa Sudamericana: 2004
 Torneo Apertura: 2005
 Torneo Clausura: 2006

References

External links

Juan Carlos Bazalar at Footballdatabase

1968 births
Living people
Footballers from Lima
Association football midfielders
Peruvian footballers
Peru international footballers
Club Universitario de Deportes footballers
Ciclista Lima Association footballers
Sport Boys footballers
Club Alianza Lima footballers
Veria F.C. players
FBC Melgar footballers
Cienciano footballers
Sport Áncash footballers
Peruvian Primera División players
Super League Greece players
2007 Copa América players
Peruvian expatriate footballers
Expatriate footballers in Greece
Peruvian football managers
Asociación Deportiva Tarma managers
Deportivo Garcilaso managers